Temple Beth Ora is a Reform Judaism synagogue located at 12313 105 Avenue NW in the Westmount neighbourhood of Edmonton, Alberta, Canada. Founded in 1979 as Beth Ora Synagogue, it is the city's only Reform Synagogue.

Over the years, the congregation has occupied several buildings; for many years Temple Beth Ora conducted services in the JCC Building overlooking the North Saskatchewan River. In 2007, TBO moved from the Edmonton JCC to Chesed Shel Emeth, home of Edmonton's Chevra Kadisha.

See also
History of the Jews in Canada

Notes

Reform synagogues in Canada
Synagogues in Edmonton